Christoph Draeger (born 1965 in Zurich, Switzerland) is a Swiss multimedia artist. Born in Zurich, he currently lives and works between Vienna and New York, that is to say Umeå, Sweden.

Life and career

From 1986 until 1990 Draeger attended the School of Visual Arts in Lucerne, Switzerland, and from 1990 until 1991 he studied at École Nationale Supérieure des Arts Visuels de la Cambre in Brussels, Belgium. Afterwards, in 1996, Draeger went to New York for a scholarship at P.S.1's International Studio Program and stayed there until he moved to Vienna in 2011.

His works have been exhibited worldwide in galleries and institutions such as the Centre Georges Pompidou in Paris, Kunst-Werke Institute for Contemporary Art in Berlin, Whitney Museum of American Art in New York, Massachusetts Museum of Contemporary Art, and Santiago Museum of Contemporary Art. Draeger has also taken part in several important art events, Venice Biennale and Art Cologne among others. His works are in many private and institutional collections such as the Centre Georges Pompidou in Paris, Kunsthaus Zürich, and the Whitney Museum of American Art and Brooklyn Museum in New York.

He sometimes works together with his wife, Austrian artist Heidrun Holzfeind, who specialises in documentaries and photography. They have a little son with whom Draeger recreated fragments from the Hollywood movie The Road (2009) for his work The Rd. (2013). Draeger sometimes collaborates with his brother, Urs Draeger who is the manager of a design agency.

Artistic practice and interests

In his artistic practice, Draeger relies mainly on installation, photography and video, in which he uses both archival and self-made footage. He also occasionally explores the medium of sculpture and practices performance art. As Draeger's interests revolve around media-saturated culture and people's struggle with disasters, most of his works focus on catastrophes and media representations of tragic events.

Works

Selected works by Christoph Draeger.

Voyages Apocaliptiques
Voyages Apocaliptiques (from 1994) is a long-term photographic project, which began in 1994 and is still in progress. The cycle is dedicated to the elusiveness of memory in a broad sense. It comprises so far around 100 photos taken by Draeger of places affected by some kind of catastrophe, including photographs of areas that look like nothing tragic have ever happened there, and of places permanently marked with those events or still coping with their effects.

The Last News
The video installation The Last News (2002) by Draeger and American artist Reynold Reynolds is a coverage of the end of the world. It is a reaction to media response to the events of 9/11, mocking and exaggerating the way in which tragic events are presented in mass-media, but also commenting on the process of transmission and reception of information and its reliability faced with commercial sensationalism.

Black September
The video installation Black September (2002) is a video reconstruction of the events from the XXth Olympiad in Munich in 1972 when eleven members of the Israeli Olympic team were abducted by Palestinian terrorists. It was one of the first events of this kind in which media had such profound impact on the situation; the terrorists planned their next steps on the basis of information they had heard on the television. Draeger's installation also includes excerpts from the authentic TV coverage, set in a reconstructed hotel room where the events occurred.

Helenés
The title of the video Helenés (2005) originated as a result of Draeger's reading mistake - the original material, a film showing dramatised nuclear protection exercises from the Cold War era, was actually named Jelenés. The 16mm film roll was found by the artist in the storage room of a disaster prevention camp in Hungary. The thing that struck Draeger the most in the original film was its monotonous narration in Hungarian, which he decided to subtitle with George W. Bush's second term inaugural address. By relating the presidential speech to the Cold War discourse, the artist emphasizes the durability of the American ideological project, positing a special role of the United States and a necessity for its hegemony.

Tsunami Architecture
Tsunami Architecture (2012) by Christoph Draeger and Heidrun Holzfeind is a project composed of a book and a video. It follows the effects of the 2004 Indian Ocean tsunami, one of the worst natural catastrophes in history. Draeger and Holzfeind say about this project: "We were interested in how the flood of aid money has transformed the affected regions, rebuilt and refashioned local economies and shaped communities. How does collective and individual memory work, years after such highly publicized media event? How has architecture built after the tsunami been able to respond to the individual needs of affected communities? How were these communities able to participate in the recovery process? How have these structures been adapted over time by their inhabitants, and how did architectural interventions alter societal and communal structures?"

Awards, grants & residencies

List of selected Draeger's awards, scholarships and residencies.

2014: Residency in Los Angeles
2008: Residency in Cairo 
2007: Residency at CCA, Center for Contemporary Art Ujazdowski Castle, Warsaw 
2006: Residency at Springhill Institute, Birmingham; Residency of the Landis+Gyr Foundation, London 
2005: Grant of the Kanton Zürich
2004: Grant of the City of Zurich 
2003: Grant Steo Foundation, Küssnacht 
2002: Residency at Headlands Center for the Arts, Sausalito; California Residency at Faxinal des Artes, Parana, Brazil 
1997: Promotion Grant of the Graubünden Government 
1996: P.S.1, Institute for Contemporary Art, New York  
1994: Swiss National Art Award  
1991: Grant of the Landis+Gyr Foundation

Exhibitions

List of selected Draeger's solo exhibitions.

Garage Sale, Y Gallery, New York, 2014 
Unforced Errors, lokal 30, Warsaw, 2014 
Christopher Draeger Video Retrospectiva, Video Biennale, Museum of Contemporary Art, Santiago de Chile, 2013
Tsunami Architecture (in collaboration with Heidrun Holzfeind), OK Centrum for Contemporary Art, Linz, 2012
Temporary Wall of Voodoo, West Gallery, Den Hague, 2011
Apocalipso Place (in collaboration with Reynold Reynolds), lokal_30, Warsaw, 2011 
Monumental, Y Gallery, Bowery, New York, 2010 
Tropolicalia, Centre for Contemporary Art Ujazdowski Castle, Warsaw, 2009 
The End of the Remake, Roebling Hall, New York, 2008
Music Is the Healing Force of the Universe, Catharine Clark Gallery, San Francisco, 2008 
Helenés Rising, Living Room, Cologne, 2007 
Old works, Galerie Anne de Villepoix, Paris, 2006 
Munich, Susanne Vielmetter Projects, Los Angeles, 2005
The Brazil Project, Roebling Hall, New York, 2005  
New Landscapes, Catharine Clark Gallery, San Francisco, 2004
Memories of Terror From a Safe Distance, Kunstmuseum Solothurn, 2003
Black September, mullerdechiara gallery, Berlin, 2002 
If You Lived Here You Would Be Dead Now, Roebling Hall, New York, 2001  
Inundacions, CCCB, Centre de Cultura Contemporània, Barcelona, 2000 
Going All The Way, Kunstforum Baloise, Basel, Switzerland, 2000 
Apocalypso Place (in collaboration with Reynold Reynolds), Liebman Magnan Gallery, New York, 1999 
Lakehurst NJ, Zeppelinmuseum, Friedrichshafen, Germany, 1999
New York-Serneus Retour, Kulturhaus Rosengarten, Gruesch, 1998
Schleutelwerken, Galerie Fons Welters, Amsterdam, 1996
SOLO, Etablissements d'en Face, Brussels, 1991

References

External links 
 
 Interview with Christoph Draeger about disasters and disastertainment, surveillance, copies and originals, critical distance, reenactments, layers of meanings, and provocation. 2016

Swiss artists
Multimedia artists
1965 births
Living people